Kristín Anna Arnþórsdóttir (born 5 October 1965) is an Icelandic former multi-sport athlete. She was a member of Iceland's national teams in both football and handball. She was named the Úrvalsdeild kvenna Football Player of the Year in 1986 when she also lead the league in goals scored.

Football
Kristín played 99 league games for Valur, scoring 63 goals. She had a short comeback with Grótta in 1998, appearing in 4 games and scoring 2 goals. She played 12 games for the Iceland national football team from 1984 to 1994, although there was no active national team from 1988 to 1992.  She started her career as a defender but later moved to the forward position.

Honours

Titles
 Icelandic championship
 1986, 1988, 1989
 Icelandic Cup
 1984, 1985, 1986, 1987, 1988, 1990, 1995

Awards
 Úrvalsdeild kvenna Player of the Year
 1986
 Úrvalsdeild kvenna Top Goal Scorer
 1986

Handball
During the winters, Kristín played handball for several years, first for ÍR and later for Valur. She played 8 games for the Icelandic national handball team, scoring 18 goals. In 1993, she won the Icelandic Cup while pregnant of her second child.

Titles
 Icelandic Cup
 Winner : 1988, 1993

Personal life
Kristín's daughter, Ásta Eir Árnadóttir, debuted for the Icelandic national football team in 2019.

References

External links
 

1965 births
Living people
Kristin Anna Arnþorsdottir
Kristin Anna Arnþorsdottir
Kristin Anna Arnþorsdottir
Kristin Anna Arnþorsdottir
Kristin Anna Arnþorsdottir
Kristin Anna Arnþorsdottir
Women's association football defenders
Women's association football forwards